David Gérard (born 26 November 1977 in Toulon), is a former French rugby union player. He played as a lock.

He started his career with RC Toulonnais. He also played with Stade Toulousain with which he won several titles, including the 2003 and 2005 Heineken Cup Finals (the former he started and the latter he was a replacement). He earned his only cap with the French national team on 16 June 1999 against Tonga.

Honours 
 Stade Toulousain
 French rugby champion 2001
 Heineken Cup 2003 and 2005
 Racing Métro 92
 Rugby Pro D2 2009

References

External links 
 ESPN profile
 European Rugby Cup David Gérard page

Living people
French rugby union players
France international rugby union players
Stade Toulousain players
1977 births
Rugby union locks
Sportspeople from Toulon
RC Toulonnais players
CA Bordeaux-Bègles Gironde players
Racing 92 players
Expatriate rugby union players in England
French expatriate sportspeople in England
French expatriate rugby union players
French rugby union coaches
Northampton Saints players